An analog telephone adapter (ATA) is a device for connecting traditional analog telephones, fax machines, and similar customer-premises devices to a digital telephone system or a voice over IP telephony network.

An ATA is often built into a small enclosure with an internal or external power adapter, an Ethernet port, one or more foreign exchange station (FXS) telephone ports. Such devices may also have a foreign exchange office (FXO) interface for providing alternative access to traditional landline telephone service. 

The ATA provides dial tone, Ringing Generator, DC power, caller ID data and other standard telephone line signaling (known collectively as BORSCHT) to the telephone connected to a modular jack. 

The digital interface of the ATA typically consists of an Ethernet port to connect to an Internet Protocol (IP) network, but may also be a USB port for connecting the device to a personal computer.

Using such an ATA, it is possible to connect a conventional telephone to a remote VoIP server. The ATA communicates with the server using a protocol such as H.323, SIP, MGCP, SCCP or IAX, and encodes and decodes the voice signal using a voice codec such as G.711, G.729, GSM, iLBC or others. Since the ATA communicates directly with the VoIP server, it does not require a personal computer or any software such as a softphone. It uses approximately 3 to 5 watts of electricity, depending on the model and brand.

Often an ATA is connected between an IP network (such as a broadband connection) and an existing telephone jack in a residence to provide service in all locations of the residence where telephones are connected. public switched telephone network (PSTN) providers on all the other telephone jacks in the residence.

References

VoIP hardware
Telephony equipment